Chamaesciadium flavescens is a species of flowering plant in the family Apiaceae, the only species of the genus Chamaesciadium. It is found in Southwest Asia and the Caucasus.

References

Apioideae
Flora of the Caucasus
Flora of Western Asia
Monotypic Apioideae genera